Dekkoo is a Philadelphia-based subscription streaming service with a focus on LGBT+ related content, particularly by and for gay men. It features a mixture of programs from other sources and original content, and derives its income from subscription fees rather than advertising. It is available on streaming devices such as Roku, Apple TV, Chromecast, and Amazon Fire.

The service was co-founded in 2015 by Derek Curl and Brian Sokel. The launch followed the 2014 acquisition of TLA Entertainment Group in 2014. 

According to Sokel, the name is based on a Hindi slang word, "dekka", which he said means "take a glance at something" and they thought the name "Dekkoo just sounded cuter."

During the COVID-19 pandemic in 2020, the company launched a short-film contest.

Dekkoo Originals 

Dekkoo is home to a growing collection of Dekkoo Originals (exclusive content to Dekkoo).

References

2015 establishments in Pennsylvania
Gay male mass media
Internet television streaming services